The Vietnamese people or Kinh people are a Southeast Asian ethnic group native to modern-day Northern Vietnam and Southern China (Jing Islands, Dongxing, Guangxi). The native language is Vietnamese, the most widely spoken Austroasiatic language.

Vietnamese Kinh people account for just over 85.32% of the population of Vietnam in the 2019 census, and are officially known as Kinh people to distinguish them from the other minority groups residing in the country such as the Hmong, Cham, or Mường. The Vietnamese are one of the four main groups of Vietic speakers in Vietnam, the others being the Mường, Thổ, and Chứt people. They are related to the Gin people, a minority ethnic group in China.

Terminology
According to Churchman (2010), all endonyms and exonyms referring to the Vietnamese such as Viet (related to ancient Chinese geographical imagination), Kinh (related to medieval administrative designation), or Keeu and Kæw (derived from Jiāo 交, ancient Chinese toponym for Northern Vietnam, Old Chinese *kraw) by Kra-Dai speaking peoples, are related to political structures or have common origins in ancient Chinese geographical imagination. Most of the time, the Austroasiatic-speaking ancestors of the modern Kinh under one single ruler might have assumed for themselves a similar or identical social self-designation inherent in the modern Vietnamese first-person pronoun ta (us, we, I) to differentiate themselves with other groups. In the older colloquial usage, ta corresponded to "ours" as opposed to "theirs", and during colonial time they were "nước ta" (our country) and "tiếng ta" (our language) in contrast to "nước tây" (western countries) and "tiếng tây" (western languages).

Việt
The term "" (Yue) in Early Middle Chinese was first written using the logograph "戉" for an axe (a homophone), in oracle bone and bronze inscriptions of the late Shang dynasty ( BC), and later as "越". At that time it referred to a people or chieftain to the northwest of the Shang. In the early 8th century BC, a tribe on the middle Yangtze were called the Yangyue, a term later used for peoples further south. Between the 7th and 4th centuries BC Yue/Việt referred to the State of Yue in the lower Yangtze basin and its people. From the 3rd century BC the term was used for the non-Chinese populations of south and southwest China and northern Vietnam, with particular ethnic groups called Minyue, Ouyue (Vietnamese: Âu Việt), Luoyue (Vietnamese: Lạc Việt), etc., collectively called the Baiyue (Bách Việt,). The term Baiyue/Bách Việt first appeared in the book Lüshi Chunqiu compiled around 239 BC. According to Ye Wenxian (1990), apud Wan (2013), the ethnonym of the Yuefang in northwestern China is not associated with that of the Baiyue in southeastern China.

The late medieval period saw the rise of Vietnamese elites identified themselves with the ancient Yue in order to incline with 'an ancient origin', and that identity might have born by constructing traditions. By the 17th and 18th centuries AD, educated Vietnamese apparently referred to themselves as người Việt 𠊛越 (Viet people) or người Nam 𠊛南 (southern people).

Kinh
Beginning in the 10th and 11th centuries, a strand of Viet-Muong (northern Vietic language) with influence from a hypothetic Chinese dialect in northern Vietnam, dubbed as Annamese Middle Chinese, started to become what is now the Vietnamese language. Its speakers called themselves the "Kinh" people, meaning people of the "metropolitan" centered around the Red River Delta with Hanoi as its capital. Historic and modern Chữ Nôm scripture classically uses the Han character '京', pronounced "Jīng" in Mandarin, and "Kinh" with Sino-Vietnamese pronunciation. Other variants of Proto-Viet-Muong were driven from the lowlands by the Kinh and were called Trại (寨 Mandarin: Zhài), or "outpost" people," by the 13th century. These became the modern Mường people. According to Victor Lieberman, người Kinh (Chữ Nôm: 𠊛京) may be a colonial-era term for Vietnamese speakers inserted anachronistically into translations of pre-colonial documents, but literature on 18th century ethnic formation is lacking.

History

Origins and pre-history
The forerunners of the ethnic Vietnamese were Proto-Vietic people who descended from Proto-Austroasiatic people who may have originated from somewhere in Southern China, Yunnan, the Lingnan, or the Yangtze River, or mainland Southeast Asia, together with the Monic, who settled further to the west and the Khmeric migrated further south. Most archaeologists and linguists, and other specialists like Sinologists and crop experts, believe that they arrived no later than 2000 BC bringing with them the practice of riverine agriculture and in particular the cultivation of wet rice. Some linguists (James Chamberlain, Joachim Schliesinger) suggested that the Vietic-speaking people migrated from North Central Region to the Red River Delta, which had originally been inhabited by Tai-speakers. However, Michael Churchman found no records of population shifts in Jiaozhi (centered around the Red River Delta) in Chinese sources, indicating that a fairly stable population of Austroasiatic speakers, ancestral to modern Vietnamese, inhabited in the delta during the Han-Tang periods. Other proposes that Northern Vietnam and Southern China were never  homogeneous in term of ethnicity and languages, but peoples shared some customs. These ancient tribes did not have any kind of defined ethnic boundary and could not be described as "Vietnamese" (Kinh) in any satisfactory sense. Any attempt of identify an ethnic group in ancient Vietnam is problematized inaccurate.

Another theory, based on linguistic diversity, locates the most probable homeland of the Vietic languages in modern-day Bolikhamsai Province and Khammouane Province in Laos as well as parts of Nghệ An Province and Quảng Bình Province in Vietnam. In the 1930s, clusters of Vietic-speaking communities were discovered in the hills of eastern Laos, are believed to be the earliest inhabitants of that region. Archaeogenetics demonstrated that before the Dong Son period, the Red River Delta's inhabitants were predominantly Austroasiatic: genetic data from Phùng Nguyên culture's Mán Bạc burial site (dated 1,800 BC) have close proximity to modern Austroasiatic speakers such as the Khmer and Mlabri; meanwhile, "mixed genetics" from Đông Sơn culture's Núi Nấp site showed affinity to "Dai from China, Tai-Kadai speakers from Thailand, and Austroasiatic speakers from Vietnam, including the Kinh".

According to Vietnamese legend The Tale the Hồng Bàng Clan (Hồng Bàng thị truyện) written in the 15th century, the first Vietnamese descended from the dragon lord Lạc Long Quân and the fairy Âu Cơ. They married and had one hundred eggs, from which hatched one hundred children. Their eldest son ruled as the Hùng king. The Hùng kings were claimed to be descended from the mythical figure Shen Nong.

Early history and Chinese rule
The earliest reference of the proto-Vietnamese in Chinese annals was the Lạc (Chinese: Luo), Lạc Việt, or the Dongsonian, an ancient tribal confederacy of perhaps polyglot Austroasiatic and Kra-Dai speakers occupied the Red River Delta. The Lạc developed the metallurgical Đông Sơn Culture and the Văn Lang chiefdom, ruled by the semi-mythical Hùng kings. To the south of the Dongsonians was the Sa Huỳnh Culture of the Austronesian Chamic people. Around 400–200 BC, the Lạc came to contact with the Âu Việt (a splinter group of Tai people) and the Sinitic people from the north. According to a late third or early fourth century AD Chinese chronicle, the leader of the Âu Việt, Thục Phán, conquered Văn Lang and deposed the last Hùng king. Having submissions of Lạc lords, Thục Phán proclaimed himself King An Dương of Âu Lạc kingdom.

In 179 BC, Zhao Tuo, a Chinese general who has established the Nanyue state in modern-day Southern China, annexed Âu Lạc, and began the Sino-Vietic interaction that lasted in a millennium. In 111 BC, the Han Empire conquered Nanyue, brought the Northern Vietnam region under Han rule.

By the 7th century to 9th century AD, as the Tang Empire ruled over the region, historians such as Henri Maspero proposed that Vietnamese-speaking people became separated from other Vietic groups such as the Mường and Chứt due to heavier Chinese influences on the Vietnamese. Other argue that a Vietic migration from north central Vietnam to the Red River Delta in the seventh century replaced the original Tai-speaking inhabitants. In the mid-9th century, local rebels aided by Nanzhao tore the Tang Chinese rule to nearly collapse. The Tang reconquered the region in 866, causing half of the local rebels to flee into the mountains, which historians believe that was the separation between the Mường and the Vietnamese took at the end of Tang rule in Vietnam. In 938, the Vietnamese leader Ngô Quyền who was a native of Thanh Hóa, led Viet forces defeated the Chinese Southern Han armada at Bạch Đằng River and proclaimed himself king, became the first Viet king of polity that now could be perceived as "Vietnamese".

Medieval and early modern period

Ngô Quyền died in 944 and his kingdom collapsed into chaos and disturbances between twelve warlords and chiefs. In 968, a leader named Đinh Bộ Lĩnh united them and established the Đại Việt (Great Việt) kingdom. With assistance of powerful Buddhist monks, Đinh Bộ Lĩnh chose Hoa Lư in the southern edge of the Red River Delta as the capital instead of Tang-era Đại La, adopted Chinese-style imperial titles, coinage, and ceremonies and tried to preserve the Chinese administrative framework. The independence of Đại Việt, according to Andrew Chittick, allows it "to develop its own distinctive political culture and ethnic consciousness." In 979, Emperor Đinh Tiên Hoàng was assassinated, and Queen Dương Vân Nga married with Dinh's general Lê Hoàn, appointed him as Emperor. Disturbances in Đại Việt attracted attentions from neighbouring Chinese Song dynasty and Champa Kingdom, but they were defeated by Lê Hoàn. A Khmer inscription dated 987 records the arrival of Vietnamese merchants (Yuon) in Angkor. Chinese writers, Song Hao, Fan Chengda and Zhou Qufei, both reported that the inhabitants of Đại Việt "tattooed their foreheads, crossed feet, black teeth, bare feet and blacken clothing." The early 11th century Cham inscription of Chiên Đàn, My Son, erected by king of Champa Harivarman IV (r. 1074–1080), mentions that he had offered Khmer (Kmīra/Kmir) and Viet (Yvan) prisoners as slaves to various local gods and temples of the citadel of Tralauṅ Svon.

Successive Vietnamese royal families from the Đinh, Early Lê, Lý dynasties and (Hoa)/Chinese ancestry Trần and Hồ dynasties ruled the kingdom peacefully from 968 to 1407. Emperor Lý Thái Tổ (r. 1009–1028) relocated the Vietnamese capital from Hoa Lư to Đại La, the center of the Red River Delta in 1010. They practiced elitist marriage alliances between clans and nobles in the country. Mahayana Buddhism became state religion, Vietnamese music instruments, dancing and religious worshipping were influenced by both Cham, Indian and Chinese styles, while Confucianism slowly gained attention and influence. The earliest surviving corpus and text in Vietnamese language dated early 12th century, and surviving Chữ Nôm script inscriptions dated early 13th century, showcasing enormous influences of Chinese culture among the early Vietnamese elites.

The Mongol Yuan dynasty unsuccessfully invaded Đại Việt in the 1250s and 1280s, though they sacked Hanoi. The Ming dynasty of China conquered Đại Việt in 1406, brought the Vietnamese under Chinese rule for 20 years, before they were driven out by Vietnamese leader Lê Lợi. The fourth grandson of Lê Lợi, Emperor Lê Thánh Tông (r. 1460–1497), is considered one of the greatest monarchs in Vietnamese history. His reign is recognized for the extensive administrative, military, education, and fiscal reforms he instituted, and a cultural revolution that replaced the old traditional aristocracy with a generation of literati scholars, adopted Confucianism, and transformed a Đại Việt from a Southeast Asian style polity to a bureaucratic state, and flourished. Thánh Tông's forces, armed with gunpowder weapons, overwhelmed the long-term rival Champa in 1471, then launched an unsuccessful invasion against the Laotian and Lan Na kingdoms in the 1480s.

16th century – Modern period

With the death of Thánh Tông in 1497, the Đại Việt kingdom swiftly declined. Climate extremes, failing crops, regionalism and factionism tore the Vietnamese apart. From 1533 to 1790s, four powerful Vietnamese families: Mạc, Lê, Trịnh and Nguyễn, each ruled on their own domains. In northern Vietnam (Đàng Ngoài–outer realm), the Lê Emperors barely sat on the throne while the Trịnh lords held power of the court. The Mạc controlled northeast Vietnam. The Nguyễn lords ruled the southern polity of Đàng Trong (inner realm). Thousands of ethnic Vietnamese migrated south, settled on the old Cham lands. European missionaries and traders from the sixteenth century brought new religion, ideas and crops to the Vietnamese (Annamese). By 1639, there were 82,500 Catholic converts throughout Vietnam. In 1651, Alexandre de Rhodes published a 300-pages catechism in Latin and romanized-Vietnamese (chữ Quốc Ngữ) or the Vietnamese alphabet.

The Vietnamese Fragmentation period ended in 1802 as Emperor Gia Long, who was aided by French mercenaries defeated the Tay Son kingdoms and reunited Vietnam. Through assimilation and brutal subjugation in the 1830s by Minh Mang, a large chunk of indigenous Cham had been assimilated into Vietnamese. By 1847, the Vietnamese state under Emperor Thiệu Trị, people that identified them as "người Việt Nam" accounted for nearly 80 percent of the country's population. This demographic model continues to persist through the French Indochina, Japanese occupation and modern day.

Between 1862 and 1867, the southern third of the country became the French colony of Cochinchina. By 1884, the entire country had come under French rule, with the central and northern parts of Vietnam separated into the two protectorates of Annam and Tonkin. The three Vietnamese entities were formally integrated into the union of French Indochina in 1887. The French administration imposed significant political and cultural changes on Vietnamese society. A Western-style system of modern education introduced new humanist values into Vietnam.

Despite having a long recorded history of the Vietnamese language and people, the identification and distinction of 'ethnic Vietnamese' or ethnic Kinh, as well as other ethnic groups in Vietnam, were only begun by colonial administration in the late 19th and early 20th century. Following colonial government's efforts of ethnic classificating, nationalism, especially ethnonationalism and eugenic Social Darwinism were encouraged among the new Vietnamese intelligentsias discourse. Ethnic tensions sparked by Vietnamese ethnonationalism peaked during the late 1940s at the beginning phase of the First Indochina War (1946–1954), which resulted in violences between Khmer and Vietnamese in the Mekong Delta. Further North Vietnam's Soviet-style social integrational and ethnic classification, tried to build an image of Diversity under the harmony of Socialism, promoting the idea of the Vietnamese nation as a 'great single family' comprised by many different ethnic groups, and Vietnamese ethnic chauvinism was officially discouraged.

Religions

According to the 2019 Census, the religious demographics of Vietnam are as follows:
86.32% Vietnamese folk religion or non religious
6.1% Catholicism
4.79% Buddhism (mainly Mahayana)
1.02% Hoahaoism
1% Protestantism
<1% Caodaism
0.77 Others
It is worth noting here that the data is highly skewered, as a large majority of Vietnamese may declare themselves atheist, yet practice forms of traditional folk religion or Mahayana Buddhism.

Estimates for the year 2010 published by the Pew Research Center:

Vietnamese folk religion, 45.3%
Unaffiliated, 29.6%
Buddhism, 16.4%
Christianity, 8.2%
Other, 0.5%

Diaspora

Originally from northern Vietnam and southern China, the Vietnamese have expanded south and conquered much of the land belonging to the former Champa Kingdom and Khmer Empire over the centuries. They are the dominant ethnic group in most provinces of Vietnam, and constitute a small percentage of the population in neighbouring Cambodia.

Beginning around the sixteenth century, groups of Vietnamese migrated to Cambodia and China for commerce and political purposes. Descendants of Vietnamese migrants in China form the Gin ethnic group in the country and primarily reside in and around Guangxi Province. Vietnamese form the largest ethnic minority group in Cambodia, at 5% of the population. Under the Khmer Rouge, they were heavily persecuted and survivors of the regime largely fled to Vietnam.

During French colonialism, Vietnam was regarded as the most important colony in Asia by the French colonial powers, and the Vietnamese had a higher social standing than other ethnic groups in French Indochina. As a result, educated Vietnamese were often trained to be placed in colonial government positions in the other Asian French colonies of Laos and Cambodia rather than locals of the respective colonies. There was also a significant representation of Vietnamese students in France during this period, primarily consisting of members of the elite class. A large number of Vietnamese also migrated to France as workers, especially during World War I and World War II, when France recruited soldiers and locals of its colonies to help with war efforts in Metropolitan France. The wave of migrants to France during World War I formed the first major presence of the Vietnamese in France and the Western world.

When Vietnam gained its independence from France in 1954, a number of Vietnamese loyal to the colonial government also migrated to France. During the partition of Vietnam into North and South, a number of South Vietnamese students also arrived to study in France, along with individuals involved in commerce for trade with France, which was a principal economic partner with South Vietnam.

Forced repatriation in 1970 and deaths during the Khmer Rouge era reduced the Vietnamese population in Cambodia from between 250,000 and 300,000 in 1969 to a reported 56,000 in 1984.

The Fall of Saigon and end of the Vietnam War prompted the start of the Vietnamese diaspora, which saw millions of Vietnamese fleeing the country from the new communist regime. Recognizing an international humanitarian crisis, many countries accepted Vietnamese refugees, primarily the United States, France, Australia and Canada. Meanwhile, under the new communist regime, tens of thousands of Vietnamese were sent to work or study in Eastern Bloc countries of Central and Eastern Europe as development aid to the Vietnamese government and for migrants to acquire skills that were to be brought home to help with development. However, after the fall of the Berlin Wall, a vast majority of these overseas Vietnamese decided to remain in their host nations.

See also

Notes

References

Bibliography

Books

Journal articles and theses

Web sources

Further reading

Amer, Ramses (1996). Vietnam's Policies and Ethnic Chinese since 1975, Sojourn, Vol. 11, Issue 1: 76–104.

Cœdès, George. (1966). The Making of South East Asia (illustrated, reprint ed.). University of California Press. . Retrieved 7 August 2013.

Contributor: Far-Eastern Prehistory Association Asian Perspectives, Volume 28, Issue 1. (1990) University Press of Hawaii. Retrieved 7 August 2013.

Hall, Kenneth R., ed. (2008). Secondary Cities and Urban Networking in the Indian Ocean Realm, C. 1400–1800. Volume 1 of Comparative urban studies. Lexington Books. . Retrieved 7 August 2013.

Marr, David G. (2010). Vietnamese, Chinese, and Overseas Chinese during the Chinese Occupation of Northern Indochina (1945-1946), Chinese Southern Diaspora Studies, Vol. 4: 129–139.

Ungar, E. S. (1988). The Struggle Over the Chinese Community in Vietnam, 1946–1986, Pacific Affairs, Vol. 60, Issue 4: 596–614.

External links

 
Ethnic groups in Vietnam